Governor Plaisted may refer to:

Frederick W. Plaisted (1865–1943), 48th Governor of Maine
Harris M. Plaisted (1828–1898), 38th Governor of Maine